The Angel and the Dark River is the third album by the British doom/death metal band My Dying Bride. The 1996 re-release contains one bonus track "The Sexuality of Bereavement" and a bonus CD titled Live at the Dynamo. The Live CD was recorded during their appearance at the Dynamo Festival in 1995.

Aaron Stainthorpe's lyrics continued in the vein of Turn Loose the Swans, focusing on religious symbolism and relationship problems. Stainthorpe has said in many interviews that "Two Winters Only" is his favourite My Dying Bride song.

Five of the album's six tracks appear on the band's VHS and DVD For Darkest Eyes.

Production
For the first time in the band's history, guitar player Andrew Craighan was the sole composer of a My Dying Bride record, which was considered “strange” to the guitarist. Many song ideas for The Angel and the Dark River were completed during the recording of the album at Academy Studios. Craighan cites "The Cry of Mankind" as an example: "we had the vocals, we had that guitar line [Calvin Robertshaw's repetitive arpeggio background guitar], we had the drums and the bass. The other guitar line, the heavier guitar line, was non-existent."

Musical style
The Angel and the Dark River was arguably the release that saw the band travel furthest from their death metal origins. Aaron Stainthorpe dispensed with his death grunt entirely, and Martin Powell's violin and keyboard playing now seemed to be the basis around which the rest of the arrangement was built. Apart from the final track of the original release ("Your Shameful Heaven"), the tempo was unremittingly slow.

Themes
This water-charged inspiration comes from their home, the north of England. Andrew Craighan said that they "subscribe very much to the ideas of the mist and the fog and the castles. All of that typical English stuff. Constantly fucking raining. And it's just always bleak here. It's always cold. It's always miserable. We actually kind of enjoy that in a sick way, so to write about it and to sing about it is nothing new."

Touring and Promotion
My Dying Bride were invited by Steve Harris to be the opening band of Iron Maiden's European tour. Harris himself made the invitation, phoning Andrew Craighan to tell him that he thought The Angel and the Dark River was "a killer album". Peaceville later on reissued the record in a limited double-CD edition, featuring an alternate cover scheme and an extra disc with their 1995 Dynamo Open Air live performance. About the concert, MDB guitarist Andrew Craighan revealed:

Reception

In October 2011, The Angel and the Dark River was awarded IMPALA's gold record for sales of at least 75,000 copies throughout Europe.

Track listing

Digipak ed. CDXVILE 50 only, and re-issue 2CD)

Live at the Dynamo

 Your River – 8:13
 A Sea to Suffer In – 6:21
 Your Shameful Heaven – 6:21
 The Forever People – 4:52

Credits
 Aaron Stainthorpe - vocals, cover art, photos
 Andrew Craighan - guitar
 Calvin Robertshaw - guitar
 Adrian Jackson - bass
 Martin Powell - violin, keyboard
 Rick Miah - drums

Charts

References

My Dying Bride albums
1995 albums